The New York Film Critics Circle (NYFCC) is an American film critic organization founded in 1935 by Wanda Hale from the New York Daily News. Its membership includes over 30 film critics from New York-based daily and weekly newspapers, magazines, and online publications. In December of each year, the organization meets to vote on the New York Film Critics Circle Awards, given annually to honor excellence in cinema worldwide of the calendar year. The NYFCC also gives special stand-alone awards to individuals and organizations that have made significant contributions to the art of cinema, including writers, directors, producers, film critics, film restorers, historians and service organizations. The NYFCC Awards are the oldest given by film critics in the country, and one of the most prestigious.

Award ceremonies
Note: Dates listed are those of when the awards were actually given. Announcement dates are earlier.

Award categories

Current categories
 Best Actor
 Best Actress
 Best Animated Film
 Best Cinematography
 Best Director
 Best Film
 Best First Film
 Best Foreign Language Film 
 Best Non-Fiction Film (formerly known as Best Documentary Film)
 Best Screenplay
 Best Supporting Actor
 Best Supporting Actress

Former categories
 Best New Director

References

External links
 
 

International film awards
American film awards
Lists of films by award
Awards established in 1935
New York Film Critics Circle Awards
American film critics associations
1935 establishments in New York City